Vivian Lee (born ) is an Australian weightlifter, competing in the 48 kg category and representing Australia at international competitions. She competed at world championships, most recently at the 2011 World Weightlifting Championships.

Major results

References

1978 births
Living people
Australian female weightlifters
Place of birth missing (living people)
Weightlifters at the 2010 Commonwealth Games
Commonwealth Games competitors for Australia
20th-century Australian women
21st-century Australian women